Parasiempre is a live album by the Spanish rock band Héroes del Silencio issued after the "Avalancha Tour" in 1996, where the group performed in Europe, South America and North America. The title is taken from a song of the album Avalancha. The first part of the album was recorded on June 8, 1996 in Zaragoza and the second part on 7 June 1996 in Madrid. In this album the song Decadencia is 11 minutes long and is fully improvised in the last concert of the "Avalancha Tour", in the last minutes the band says: "Nos vemos en la gira del próximo milenio", making a promise to do a tour in the new millennium like the one in September 2007.

Track listing 

Disc 1
"Deshacer el Mundo" - 5:24
"Iberia Sumergida" - 5:08
"Días de Borrasca (Víspera de Resplandores)" - 5:57
"Parasiempre" - 4:07
"El Camino del Exceso" - 5:50
"Sirena Varada" - 4:26
"Maldito Duende" - 5:18
"La Chispa Adecuada (Bendecida III)" - 5:20
"Oración" - 4:00
"Nuestros Nombres" - 7:10

Disc 2
"Hechizo" - 3:27
"Entre Dos Tierras" - 5:54
"Avalancha" - 6:42
"Flor de Loto" - 6:19
"Flor Venenosa" - 4:19
"La Herida" - 4:43
"Mar adentro" - 4:36
"Opio" - 5:51
"La Decadencia" (Medley) - 11:03

The edition for Mexico does not contain songs Parasiempre in disc 1 and Hechizo in disc 2.

Personnel
 Alan Boguslavsky - Rhythm guitar
 Enrique Bunbury - Vocalist
 Joaquin Cardiel - Bass
 Juan Valdivia - Lead guitar
 Pedro Andreu - Drums

Certifications

References

External links
 Heroes Del Silencio official Site

Héroes del Silencio albums
Live Rock en Español albums
1996 live albums
EMI Records live albums
Spanish-language live albums